The Count's Chapel (Gravenkapel in Dutch) is a medieval chapel in Kortrijk, Belgium. It is located next to the Church of Our Lady. It was built under Louis II, Count of Flanders as a mausoleum to the Counts of Flanders and a shrine to Saint Catherine.

History 
The Count's Chapel was finished around 1374.

Features 
 Portraits of the Counts of Flanders
All niches are ornate and were successively decorated with portraits of each Count of Flanders. It is thought that Jan van Hasselt painted the first series of portraits, from the legendary Liederic de Buc to Louis de Maele the founder of the chapel. The effigies of the successors of Louis de Maele were painted by Melchior Broederlam in 1407. The authors of the next portraits, until Charles V, are unknown.
 Statue of Saint Catherine
White marble statue carved by André Beauneveu.
 Decorations of the niche spandrels.

References 
 Dobbelaere L. & Caullet G., Guide illustré de Courtrai

External link

History of Kortrijk
Medieval churches